Tan Binliang (born 4 November 1989) is a Chinese footballer who plays as a midfielder for Jiangxi Beidamen.

Career

Before the 2013 season, Tan signed for Jönköpings Södra in Sweden after playing for  Chinese second division side Guangdong Sunray Cave, becoming the first Chinese player to play in Sweden, where he suffered an injury and from loneliness.

In 2013, Tan signed for Chinese second division club Shenzhen FC, where he made over 27 league appearances and scored over 0 goals.

Before the 2018 season, Tan was sent on loan to Nantong Zhiyun in the Chinese third division, where he suffered a broken leg.

Before the 2021 season, he signed for Chinese second division team Nanjing City.

References

External links
Tan Binliang at playmakerstats.com

Chinese footballers
Expatriate footballers in Sweden
Living people
China League Two players
China League One players
1989 births
Chinese expatriate footballers
Chinese expatriate sportspeople in Sweden
Jönköpings Södra IF players
Shenzhen F.C. players
Nantong Zhiyun F.C. players
Association football midfielders